Caloptilia semifascia is a moth of the family Gracillariidae. It is known from most of Europe, except the Iberian Peninsula, Ireland, Iceland and the western part of the Balkan Peninsula.

The wingspan is 10–12 mm. Adults are on wing from late July to October and again, after hibernating, until May.

The larvae feed on Acer campestre. They mine the leaves of their host plant. The first part of the mine is a hardly visible upper-surface epidermal corridor. This later becomes a triangular blotch-mine. Older larvae leave the mine and live freely in a spun together leaf segment. The larvae makes three such cones, each increasing in size. These may or may not be made on the same leaf. Pupation takes place in a yellow cocoon.

Taxonomy
Some authors consider it a synonym of Caloptilia onustella.

References

semifascia
Moths of Europe
Moths described in 1828